Argo Glacier is a glacier in the Miller Range,  long, flowing northeast to enter Marsh Glacier just south of Macdonald Bluffs. It was named by the New Zealand Geological Survey Antarctic Expedition (1961–62) after the Argo, the vessel sailed by Jason in Greek mythology.

See also
 List of glaciers in the Antarctic
 Glaciology

References 

Glaciers of Oates Land